Imma boeta is a moth in the family Immidae. It was described by Druce in 1898. It is found in Panama.

The forewings are black, irrorated with grey scales at the base, with a large oval grey spot about the middle of the wing extending from the costal margin almost to the inner margin, the fringe black, with a grey patch at the anal angle. The hindwings are brownish-black, paler at the base and along the inner margin.

References

Moths described in 1898
Immidae
Moths of Central America